Kostas Tsalikidis (Κώστας Τσαλικίδης; July 23, 1966 – March 9, 2005) was Vodafone Greece's Network Planning Manager when he died at the age of 39 during the Greek wiretapping case of 2004/05, in what appeared to be a suicide. The incident, which Vodafone Greece was involved in, was one of the biggest political scandals of recent Greek history—tapping mobile phones of members of the cabinet, the Prime Minister, and hundreds of others. The authorities and the media strongly feel that Tsalikidis's death  was associated with his position in the company.

Background
Kostas Tsalikidis was born on July 23, 1966. He worked for Vodafone Greece for almost 11 years, beginning as Switching Planning and Technology Manager. From 2001 until his death, he was responsible for all planning activities for the GSM, GPRS and UMTS Vodafone Panafon Core Network (Design, Architecture, Dimensioning, Ordering, Rollout, Interconnect, Optimisation). He was also responsible for all technology issues of the Core Network (GSM, GPRS functionalities implementation and Roadmap), and liaison with Vodafone Global regarding Vodafone Networks Evolution road-maps.

Tsalikidis received his diploma from the National Technical University of Athens (NTUA), Department of Electrical and Computer Engineering. His specialization was in Telecommunications and dissertation topic on “Air Interface Measurements Collection for Mobile Telephony Systems.” He has attended seminars at the Athens University, on Management and Business Administration, technical seminars on Telecommunications, GSM Systems, Data Networks, Transport Techniques, and a number of Skills Development seminars on Team Work, Team Building, Communication Skills, Project Management and Negotiation capabilities.

As a person he was a warm, giving, honest and sharing human being. He was in an 8-year relationship to Sarra and planning to get married in June – three months after he died. They were a cheerful couple who loved travelling in their spare time all over Greece and abroad. Some of Kostas’ hobbies were to collect vintage rock records from the 60’s and 70’s and children’s toys from the same epoch.

Timeline of events according to the press

March 4, 2005
Vodafone discovers (as per company statements) foreign “interception” software in its network. Vodafone Greece doesn’t formally take the position that Ericsson installed before the Olympic games a “legal interception” software, which was subsequently locked and shut down.

March 5, 2005
Vodafone decides to remove the foreign interception software without finding the culprits of the wire tapping. Thus, according to many experts the culprits can no longer be traced. Mr. Koronias, CEO of Vodafone Greece, claimed before the Parliamentary Committee on Transparency that no one had asked him to reactivate the illegal software in order to trace the phones that intercepted the conversations in question.

The company claims that they have back up copies of the deleted data and that they committed no illegal act within the boundaries of the Act for the Protection of the Privacy of Telecommunications.

March 9, 2005
Costantinos Tsalikidis, Network Planning Supervisor for Vodafone and top level manager for the company, is found hanged in his apartment. He never left a (suicide) note nor any indication that he was suffering from any personal problems. No autopsy was conducted in situ, and the forensic report was inconclusive.

The circumstances around the death of Tsalikidis, were pronounced a year later as questionable and directly connected to his professional position at Vodafone, and the Athens Prosecutor re-opened the case. Vodafone Greece never sent a condolence telegraph to the deceased’s family, despite the fact that Mr. Tsalikidis worked at Vodafone for over a decade.

March 10, 2005
The CEO of Vodafone Greece, Mr. Koronias, briefs the Prime Minister of Greece in the presence of a Prosecutor about the wire tapping. Among the phones that were tapped was that of the Prime Minister as well as all the ministers of the current government, Members of the Parliamentary Opposition, as well as other non-parliamentary officials. He also mentions the «suicide» without however, connecting it to the wire tapping incident.

The following year however, in the context of the legal proceedings that began on February 8, 2006,  Mr. Giorgos Koronias claimed that he had the complete approval of the government, especially the Prime Minister himself, for his actions. The matter was deemed one of top national security and top secret by the government. The question at hand is why the Greek Authority for the Assurance of Information and Communication Privacy was not informed and why regular legal procedures were not followed before deactivating the software.

March 11, 2005
The Prosecutor for the Supreme Court, Mr. Dimitris Linos gives a direct order for an urgent and secret preliminary investigation to the Head Prosecutor in person. In this order there is no written mention of the suicide.

The question at hand concerns what are the findings of this 11-month investigation that has been conducted since 11 March 2005 until today, and why the entire case seems to be re-examined from scratch.

June 11, 2005
The local police precinct that investigated the death of Tsalikidis, closes the case on the suicide and sends the files to the Prosecutor’s office. According to the police, no evidence of a break-in was found, therefore, they did not see the need to conduct an autopsy nor to take fingerprints.

Vodafone Greece did not hand over any personal effects of Tsalikidis nor any data from his personal computer to his family or to the authorities, which would have greatly assisted in any investigation by the local precinct.

January 30, 2006
The Head Prosecutor, Mr. Papagelopoulos, claims to have been informed about the suicide case from the Major General, who mentioned the suicide outside of the court proceedings. A year later Vodafone Greece remained silent on the type of internal investigation that took place, on whether suspects were located and what type of sanctions were imposed on them relating to what is possibly the biggest political scandal in the modern history of Greece.

February 1, 2006
The preliminary investigation conducted by Mr. Papangelopoulos regarding the wire tapping is concluded with the closing statement that he was awaiting evidence from the State authorities.

February 2, 2006
Criminal charges are filed against unknown perpetrators for wire tapping. On the same day, three ministers make statements to the press where they congratulate Mr. Koronias for his stance to erase the software program. The next day the press characterizes the handling of this case as a huge political and communication blunder.

February 3, 2006
The press widely believes that the wire tapping case is related to the suicide of Tsalikidis. This is first page news in all the press and mass media of the country for the next two weeks. Countless news programs are assuming that the suicide of Tsalikidis may not have been a suicide.

February 8, 2006
The investigation of Tsalikidis’ death is handed over to the highly experienced Prosecutor, Mr. Diotis. For the first time in a year since the death of Tsalikidis an investigation of his apartment is conducted. The results have not been made public yet.

March 9, 2006
The day of the anniversary of Tsalikidis’ death, Mr. Koronias is cross-examined by the Parliamentary Committee on Institutions and Transparency. He stated that he did not order or receive the «lawful interception» software program. He also said that as the producer of the software, Ericsson was responsible since they had fully trained personnel on the functioning of the software program.

Mr. Koronias stated that Vodafone has a very technologically elaborate security system and that it was because of his diligence that the incident was considered to be of «national security.» Parliament also subpoenaed the head of Ericsson to appear in a future hearing.

With regard to the death of Tsalikidis, Mr. Koronias said that he mentioned the «suicide» to the ministers that he met with in March 2005 and that Vodafone was assisting authorities in any way possible with their investigation. The question here is whether an internal investigation file exists on Tsalikidis, and if so why the family members have never been informed of its findings.

September 7, 2011
Tsalikidis' family and their lawyers asked for the case to be reopened, claiming that forensic medical examination results prove that Tsalikidis' death could not have been suicide.

2017 The European Court of Justice held that the Greek authorities had not carried out an “adequate and effective” investigation to examine the causes of Tsalikidis’ death and found that the authorities were in a hurry to close the supplementary investigation by simply naming the steps they had taken and citing new reports without explaining important details.

2019 After 14 years of Investigation the alleged suicide has been pronounced a murder by the Greek Department of Justice.The case was closed.

References

External links
 IEEE Spectrum: The Athens Affair

1966 births
2005 deaths
20th-century Greek businesspeople
Suicides by hanging in Greece
National Technical University of Athens alumni
Death conspiracy theories